10th Legion Championship Fighting or 10th Legion is a UK-based Mixed Martial Arts promotion. The company was founded in 2008 and held its first event in April 2009 in Hull. The company is based in Hull, London and New Zealand.

Mixed Martial Arts combines Olympic disciplines such as Greco-Roman Wrestling, Freestyle Wrestling, Boxing and Judo with the more modern Martial Arts skills of Kickboxing/Muay Thai, Submission Fighting/Grappling – such as Brazilian jiu-jitsu

10th Legion works with other MMA organizations to build a better standard in the sport. Events are planned for 2014 in Hull, London and New Zealand.

History
10th Legion Championship Fighting has brought together fighters from around the UK, United States and Europe for international events.

10th Legion's first World Champion was five times UFC veteran Welterweight fighter Jess 'The Joker' Liaudin, who still holds his title.

Another well known 10th Legion World Champion is Lightweight fighter Abdul Mohamed.

Articles
 10th Legion Championship Fighting III in Hull
 10th Legion Championship Fighting developing a reputation
 10th Legion Championship Fighting making waves in UK MMA
 Cage Fighting: Chapman seeks top 10 spot
 Cage Fighting Comes To Hull
 We're friendly really, says cage fighter Gowans
 Army training will inspire me to be the best, insists Rouse
Cage fighter Louis Chapman expects to lead the way
 Cage fighter Chapman eyes a rankings rise
 10th Legion Championship Fighting 7 in London
 Bateman Victory
 Interview with Louis Chapman

10th Legion Championship Fighting events

 10th Legion 1: The War Machine 05-Apr-09 Hull
 10th Legion 2: Forged in Battle 27-Sept-09 Hull
 10th Legion 3: Decimation 21-Feb-10 Hull
 10th Legion 4: Rise of Olympia 21-May-10 Birmingham
 10th Legion 5: War of Independence 04-Jul-10
 10th Legion 6: Gates of Fire 27-Nov-10 Hull
 10th Legion 7: Invasion of Warriors 13-Mar-11 London
 10th Legion 8: Symbol of Power 9-Apr-11 Hull
 10th Legion 9: March to Glory 17-Sept-11 Hull
 10th Legion 10: Temple of the Titans 24-Mar-12 Hull
 10th Legion 11: Victorious 13-May-12 London
 10th Legion 12: Army of Gods 15-Sept-12 Hull
 10th Legion 13: 4-May-13 Hull
 10th Legion 14: TBC Hull
 10th Legion 15: TBC New Zealand

Organisation information: 10th Legion Championship Fighting

Current 10th Legion champions

Title holders

References

External links 
  10th Legion official website
 10th Legion event results at Sherdog
  Alan Orr official website

Sports organizations established in 2008
Mixed martial arts organizations
2008 establishments in the United Kingdom